The eleventh season of Deutschland sucht den Superstar was broadcast on German channel RTL from 8 January to 3 May 2014. The winner received a recording contract with Universal Music Group and €500,000. Participants had to be between 16 and 30 years old and could audition in 30 cities in Germany, Austria and Switzerland. Kenneth "Kay One" Glöckler, Mieze Katz and Marianne Rosenberg served as the judges.

For the second year in a row, the season featured a female final top two and produced a female "superstar" for the third time in the show's history. Aneta Sablik was announced as the winner on 3 May 2014.

History
On 13 March 2013, RTL announced that there will be an eleventh season. The judges from the previous season, with the exception of Dieter Bohlen, were replaced by rapper Kay One, singer Mieze Katz of the band MIA., and Schlager singer Marianne Rosenberg. Nazan Eckes returned as the host of the eleventh season, however, without Raúl Richter. Bill and Tom Kaulitz from Tokio Hotel and Mateo from Culcha Candela left after the completion of season 10. The season started on Wednesday, 8 January 2014, on RTL.

The season's headline was "Kandidaten an die Macht!" ("Candidates, take over!"). Therefore, it was the first season that the contestants were completely in charge of their song choice and their stage performance. This also enabled them to choose an original song.

The season premiere attracted 2.70 million viewers, which makes it the least-watched season premiere in the history of Deutschland sucht den Superstar. However, ratings improved up to 3.33 million viewers by episode three, which made it the most-watched episode of the season within the demographics between ages 14–49.

"Re-Recall"
The top 30, which consisted of 15 female and 15 male contestants, were brought to Cuba for the further competition. In the top 20 round, the judges chose the top 10 to compete in the live shows. Five of the ten eliminated contestants were given a wild card by the judges and made available for public voting. The two with the highest votes by the viewers will be joining the top 10.

Top 15

Females:
 Aneta Sablik, 23
 Anita Latifi, 18
 Elif Batman, 18
 Maxi Perez-Bursian, 20
 Meltem Acikgöz, 24
 Melody Haase, 20
 Sophia Akkara, 20
 Vanessa Valeria Rojas, 23
 Yasemin Kocak, 21

Males:

 Allesandro Di Lella, 21
 Angelo Bugday, 22
 Christopher Schnell, 25
 Daniel Ceylan, 28
 Enrico von Krawczynski, 19
 Richard Schlögl, 25

"Live-Challenge-Shows"
The Mottoshows (theme shows) of the previous seasons were replaced by six Live-Challenge-Shows. In each show, two acts get eliminated. After the final, RTL revealed the voting results for each show.

Color key

Top 12 - "Live-Challenge-Show: Dance"
Original airdate: 29 March 2014
In the first live show, the top 12 was split into two groups of six. In each group, one act had to leave the show. The challenge of the first live-challenge show required the contestant to include a dance routine into their performance.

Group performance: "Timber"

Top 10 - "Live-Challenge-Show: Band Night"
Original airdate: 5 April 2014
The challenge of the second live-challenge show was the emphasis on the vocals, meaning each performance featured a break to put focus on the contestants' vocal performance.

Top 8 - "Live-Challenge-Show: Duets"
Original airdate: 12 April 2014
The challenge of the third live-challenge show required the contestants to pick one of their competitors for a duet. Only one person of the winning duet-team was able to win the live challenge price.

Top 6 - "Live-Challenge-Show: Do Your Own Thing!"
Original airdate: 19 April 2014
The challenge of the fourth live-challenge show was to pick a song and make it their own.

Top 4 - "Live-Challenge-Show: Semi-Final"
Instead of a double elimination the semi-final featured an elimination of only one contestant, leaving three contestant in the final.
The challenge of the fifth live-challenge show was staging the beginning of one of their songs by themselves.
Original airdate: 26 April 2014

Top 3 - "Live-Challenge-Show: Final"
Original airdate: 3 May 2014
It was announced that each contestant had to write their winner's single by themselves. After the first performance one of the finalists will be eliminated and the remaining two contestants will compete for the crone.

Round 1

Round 2

 Daniel Ceylan would have performed "(Simply) The Best" and "Someone Out There to Love".

Winner of the challenges

 The winner of the last challenge was announced by the public and not by the judges like the previous challenges.

Elimination chart

References

External links
 Official website

Season 11
2014 in German music
2014 German television seasons